Gondrecourt-Aix is a commune in the Meurthe-et-Moselle department in north-eastern France.

Geography
The two hamlets in the commune lie on the right bank of the Othain, which has its source in the southern part of the commune, then flows northwestward through the commune.

See also
Communes of the Meurthe-et-Moselle department

References

Gondrecourtaix